Sant'Aspreno ai Crociferi is a church in the  neighborhood of San Carlo all'Arena, Naples, southern Italy.  It is dedicated to Saint Aspren.

See also

Churches in Naples

References

Aspreno ai Crociferi
Rione Sanità